Hubert Antonio Bodhert Barrios (born 17 January 1972) is a Colombian football manager and former player who played as a defender. He is the current manager of Alianza Petrolera.

Playing career
Born in Cartagena to a German great grandfather, Bodhert started his career with hometown side Real Cartagena. In 1995, he moved to El Cóndor, and retired two years later at the age of 25.

Managerial career
In the middle of 1997, after six months without a contract, Bodhert joined Expreso Rojo's youth categories. He was named manager of the main squad in 2004 in the place of Víctor González Scott, and remained in the role until 2006, when he moved to former side Real Cartagena as an assistant manager.

In late 2006, after Álvaro Gómez left, Bodhert was named interim manager. In December 2007, after the club's relegation from the Categoría Primera A, he was appointed manager.

Bodhert achieved promotion back to the top tier, but left the manager post in October 2011 to become the club's sporting manager. He subsequently moved to Unión Magdalena under the same role in November 2012, before returning to managerial duties with Llaneros for the 2014 campaign.

Bodhert left Llaneros in March 2015, and returned to Real Cartagena in June of that year. He was dismissed from the manager role and appointed youth football director in March 2016, but was named in charge of Jaguares de Córdoba in the following month.

On 5 December 2017, after avoiding relegation, Bodhert announced his departure from Jaguares, and took over Once Caldas two days later. On 1 January 2021, he left the club after his contract expired, and was named at the helm of Águilas Doradas three days later.

Bodhert resigned from Águilas on 2 March 2021, and took over Alianza Petrolera five days later.

References

External links

1972 births
Living people
Sportspeople from Cartagena, Colombia
Colombian footballers
Association football defenders
Real Cartagena footballers
Colombian football managers
Categoría Primera A managers
Real Cartagena managers
Llaneros F.C. managers
Once Caldas managers
Colombian people of German descent
Águilas Doradas Rionegro managers
Alianza Petrolera F.C. managers
Jaguares de Córdoba managers